Lafoeidae is a family of hydrozoans.

Genera 
The following genera are recognized within the family Lafoeidae:

 Acryptolaria Norman, 1875
 Billardia Totton, 1930
 Cryptolarella Stechow, 1913
 Filellum Hincks, 1868
 Grammaria Stimpson, 1853
 Lafoea Lamouroux, 1821

References 

 
Leptothecata
Cnidarian families